Srednje Grčevje is a settlement in the hills north of Otočec in the City Municipality of Novo Mesto in southeastern Slovenia. The area is part of the traditional region of Lower Carniola and is now included in the Southeast Slovenia Statistical Region.

The local church is dedicated to Saint George and belongs to the Parish of Šentpeter–Otočec. It was built in the 17th century.

References

External links
Srednje Grčevje on Geopedia

Populated places in the City Municipality of Novo Mesto